The 1961–62 South-West Indian Ocean cyclone season was a busy cyclone season, lasting from December to April.

Systems

Tropical Storm Ada

Ada lasted for 5 days and made landfall in Madagascar. Its peak intensity was 40 mph, or 65 km/h, in 1-minute maximum sustained winds.

Cyclone Beryl

Cyclone Chantal

Cyclone Daisy

Tropical Storm Flora

Tropical Storm Gina

The storm struck Madagascar and moved across the island, later crossing the Mozambique Channel and striking eastern Mozambique. The storm recurved to the east, passing south of Madagascar.

Tropical Depression Helene

Tropical Storm Isabel

Existed southeast of Madagascar.

Cyclone Jenny

On February 26, Cyclone Jenny was first observed to the northeast of Rodrigues. The storm moved west-southwestward between Rodrigues and St. Brandon. On the island, the storm killed 17 people and left thousands of people homeless. Later on February 28, the storm struck Réunion, killing 36 people; wind gusts at the Roland Garros Airport reached . Jenny destroyed 3,851 homes on Réunion and severely damaged another 2,619, many of them wooden, leaving about 20,000 people homeless. The storm also destroyed crops, and wrecked about 80% of the island's telephone lines. After the close succession of Carol and Jenny, officials rebuilt most homes with concrete to withstand future storms.

Tropical Storm Kate

Struck eastern Madagascar.

Tropical Storm Lucy

Passed near St. Brandon.

Cyclone Maud

Existed south of Diego Garcia and executed a loop at the end of its track.

Other storms
A tropical depression briefly existed in the northeast portion of the basin from January 19–21. At the time, it was part of the neighboring Australian basin, east of 80°. On January 22, a system named Emily existed briefly west of that general region.

See also

 Atlantic hurricane seasons: 1961, 1962
 Eastern Pacific hurricane seasons: 1961, 1962
 Western Pacific typhoon seasons: 1961, 1962
 North Indian Ocean cyclone seasons: 1961, 1962

References

South-West Indian Ocean cyclone seasons